Lvndscape (stylized as LVNDSCAPE, pronounced "landscape") is a Dutch deep house and tropical house group and producers, currently represented by DJ Lars de Vos. They signed to Spinnin' Records.

Discography

Extended plays
2016: V [Spinnin' Records]
2017: Dive with Me [Spinnin' Records]
2019: Hanging On [Spinnin'  Records]
2021: Fall Into The Night [Spinnin' Records]

Charting singles

Singles
2015: "Ragga" (with Bolier) [Source]
2015: "Speeches" (featuring Joel Baker) [Source]
2016: "Waterfalls" (with Holland Park featuring Nico Santos) [Source]
2016: "Rise Up 2K16" (with Yves Larock featuring Jaba) [Spinnin' Records]
2016: "Fed Up" (with Cheat Codes) [Spinnin' Deep]
2016: "Is This Love" (with Bob Marley and Bolier) [Spinnin' Deep]
2016: "Everyday My Life" [Spinnin' Records]
2017: "Need to Feel Loved" (with Sander van Doorn) [Doorn Records]
2017: "Walk Away" (featuring Kaptan) [Spinnin' Records]
2017: "In My Mind" (featuring Mi Manchi) [Spinnin' Records]
2017: "Dive With Me" (featuring Cathrine Lassen) [Spinnin' Records]
2018: "Know You Better" (with Sam Feldt featuring Tessa) [Spinnin' Records]
2018: "What Would You Do" (feat. Ruby Prophet) [Spinnin' Records]
2018: "Gumburanjo" [Spinnin' Records]
2018: "Riot (Lo Lo Loco)" (featuring Alida) [Spinnin' Records]
2018: "Apologize" (featuring Frida Sumeno, Jdam and Mon) [Spinnin' Records]
2018: "Yayamari" [Spinnin' Records]
2019: "Home" (featuring Jae Hall) [Spinnin' Records]
2019: "Baylamtu" [Spinnin' Records]
2019: "Down Under" (with Rat City) [Spinnin' Records]
2019: "What I'd Give" [Spinnin' Records]
2020: "I'm Like A Bird" (with John Adams) [Spinnin' Records]
2020: "No One Nobody" (featuring Tannergard) [Spinnin' Records]
2020: "Happier To Lose" [Spinnin' Records]
2020: "Turn Off The Radio" (featuring Øzma) [Spinnin' Records]
2021: "Bad Trip" (feat. ØZMA) [Spinnin' Records]
2021: "Say It A Little Louder" (with Mathieu Koss) [Spinnin' Records]
2021: "Everyone's Lonely" (feat. Ally Ahern) [Spinnin' Records]
2021: "Losing My Mind" (with AMELY) [Mentalo Music]
2022: "Because of You" [Spinnin' Records]

Remixes
2015: Redondo and Bolier featuring She Keeps Bees - "Every Single Piece" (Lvndscape Remix) [Source]
2015: Sander van Doorn - "Ori Tali Ma" (Lvndscape Remix) [Source]
2015: Bolier and Natalie Peris - "Forever and a Day" (Lvndscape Remix) [Source]
2017: Sander van Doorn and Lvndscape - "Need to Feel Loved" (Lvndscape Sunset Chill Mix) [Doorn Records]
2018: Purple Haze featuring James New - "Fall In" (LVNDSCAPE Remix) [Doorn Records]
2019: Haevn - "City Lights" (LVNDSCAPE Remix) [Haevn Music]
2021: EMPRESS - "I Won't Go Quietly" (LVNDSCAPE Remix) [Empress Music]

References

External links
Official website

Dutch DJs
Living people
Tropical house musicians
Dutch electronic musicians
Year of birth missing (living people)
Electronic dance music DJs